Alpujarras or Las Alpujarras may refer to various places in Spain:
Alpujarra Almeriense, a comarca in Almeria Province
Alpujarra Granadina,  a comarca in Granada Province
Alpujarra de la Sierra, a municipality in Granada Province
Alpujarras, La Rioja, a mountain range and natural region in La Rioja, Spain
Alpujarras, Andalucía, Spain
La Alpujarra Administrative Center, in Antioquia, Colombia
Alpujarra station, a Medellín Metro station servicing the area